Kid Notorious is an American adult animated sitcom that aired from October 22 to December 17, 2003 on Comedy Central. It starred Hollywood film producer Robert Evans as himself. Episode plots were often bizarre and absurdist in nature, featuring Evans as a James Bond type character. Guns N' Roses guitarist Slash also appeared on the show as himself. The show was directed by Pete Michels.

Characters
 Robert Evans (as himself), a playboy Hollywood producer who finds himself mixed up in bizarre and absurd situations but never loses his cool.
 Tollie Mae (Niecy Nash), Evans' loud maid. Spends most of her time binge eating chocolate and lusting after Denzel Washington. Her catchphrase is "Not in my job description." Tollie Mae was named for Tollie Mae Wilson, who was Evans' housekeeper at the time of his marriage to Ali MacGraw.
 Alan Selka (as himself), Evans' long-suffering butler, English. A running gag involves Puss Puss farting into his face. Voiced by Evans' real-life butler, Alan Selka, who is reportedly very much like his character in real life.
 Puss Puss, Evans' beloved cat, who follows him wherever he goes; she plays chess and smokes marijuana. Puss has a hate-hate relationship with English which has included pistol-whipping, neck crushing, releasing flatulence into face and placing piranha in the sauna.
 Slash (as himself), the former lead guitarist for Guns N' Roses. As in real life, Slash was Evans' close friend and next-door neighbor.
 Donald Rumsfeld (Billy West), the United States Secretary of Defense at the time. He is depicted as a sidekick and poker buddy of Evans and Slash.

Episodes

References

External links
 

2000s American adult animated television series
2000s American black comedy television series
2000s American parody television series
2000s American sitcoms
2000s American surreal comedy television series
2003 American television series debuts
2003 American television series endings
American adult animated comedy television series
American animated sitcoms
English-language television shows
Comedy Central animated television series
Comedy Central original programming
Cultural depictions of Robert Evans